Barry Glenn Nieckar (born December 16, 1967) is a Canadian former professional ice hockey player who played eight games in the National Hockey League for the Hartford Whalers, Calgary Flames and Mighty Ducks of Anaheim between 1992 and 1998. He did not record a point, but tallied 21 penalty minutes.

An undrafted player, Nieckar spent ten seasons toiling in the minor leagues before heading over to England in 1999 to play four seasons in the Ice Hockey Superleague for the London Knights and Nottingham Panthers. He retired following the 2002–03 season.

Career statistics

Regular season and playoffs

External links

1967 births
Calgary Flames players
Canadian expatriate ice hockey players in England
Canadian expatriate ice hockey players in the United States
Canadian ice hockey left wingers
Cincinnati Mighty Ducks players
Hartford Whalers players
Ice hockey people from Saskatchewan
Living people
London Knights (UK) players
Long Beach Ice Dogs (IHL) players
Mighty Ducks of Anaheim players
Nottingham Panthers players
Peoria Rivermen (IHL) players
Phoenix Roadrunners (IHL) players
People from Rama, Saskatchewan
Raleigh IceCaps players
Saint John Flames players
Springfield Falcons players
Springfield Indians players
Undrafted National Hockey League players
Utah Grizzlies (IHL) players
Virginia Lancers players